Shhh! is the second studio album by Mexican-American cumbia group A.B. Quintanilla y Los Kumbia Kings and the second studio album by Mexican-American musician A.B. Quintanilla. It was released on February 27, 2001 by EMI Latin. This album became their first number one album on the United States Billboard Top Latin Albums chart for six non-consecutive weeks in 2001.

Track listing

Personnel
This information from Allmusic.

Kumbia Kings
 A.B. Quintanilla III – bass guitar, backing vocals, arranger, vocals, producer, executive producer, mixing, composer
 Jason "DJ Kane" Cano – vocals, rap, vocal arrangement, composer
 Francisco "Cisko" Bautista Jr. – vocals, vocal arrangement, composer
 Andrew "Drew" Maes – vocals, vocal arrangement, composer
 Cruz Martínez – keyboards, arranger, programming, producer, engineer, mixing, composer
 Alex Ramírez – keyboards
 Roy "Slim" Ramírez – percussion, backing vocals
 Frankie Aranda – percussion
 Jesse "O'Jay" Martínez – drums

Additional musicians and production
 Alberto "Tico" Acuy – percussion
 Marcel Baoman – violin
 Lenny Braus – violin
 Ellen Bridger – cello
 Kathryn Collier – violin
 Isabella des Etois – violin
 John Englund – violin
 Jamie Gálvaz – arranger, programming, mixing, composer
 Jessie García – guitar
 Luigi Giraldo – engineer, vocal arrangement, production coordination, mixing, composer
 Jamie Graf – mixing
 Sahpreem A. King – arranger, programming, producer, remixer
 James "Jim" Hardy – cello
 Leslie Harlow – viola
 Ben Henderson – bass
 Amy Jackson – violin
 Kido aka Gemini – rap
 Katharine Kunz – violin
 Christopher McKellar – viola
 James McWhorter – cello
 Warren Mueller – cello
 Carlos Murguía – vocal arrangement
 Kenny O'Brien – vocal arrangement
 Jennie Outram – viola
 Kelly Parkinson – violin
 Chris Pérez – guitar
 Joe Reyes – guitar
 Judy Rich – violin
 Lynn Riling – viola
 Jimmy Shortell – trumpet
 Lois Swint – violin
 Gwen Thornton – violin
 Ricky Vela – composer
 Vitaman – arranger, programming, producer, remixer
 Barbara Williams – violin

Chart performance

Sales and certifications

References

2001 albums
Kumbia Kings albums
A. B. Quintanilla albums
Albums produced by A.B. Quintanilla
Albums produced by Cruz Martínez
EMI Latin albums
Spanish-language albums
Cumbia albums
Tejano Music Award winners for Album of the Year
Albums recorded at Q-Productions